Opine is an unincorporated community in Clarke County, Alabama, United States.

History
The name Opine likely comes from a shortened form of O'pine. A post office operated under the name Opine from 1898 to 1945.

References

Unincorporated communities in Alabama
Geography of Clarke County, Alabama